Croatian war crimes in World War II may refer to:

 The Holocaust in Croatia
 Genocide of Serbs in the Independent State of Croatia
 Porajmos